Pakoševo ( is a village in the municipality of Zelenikovo, North Macedonia.

Demographics
As of the 2021 census, Pakoševo had 243 residents with the following ethnic composition:
Macedonians 210
Persons for whom data are taken from administrative sources 14
Roma 14
Others 5

According to the 2002 census, the village had a total of 247 inhabitants. Ethnic groups in the village include:
Macedonians 210
Serbs 10
Romani 27

References

Villages in Zelenikovo Municipality